Most U.S. states and the District of Columbia have a constitutional, statutory, judicial code, or court decision provision either expressly or by interpretation allowing self-representation in state courts.

References

External links

Self-defense
Self Representation